In organic chemistry, a thial or thioaldehyde is a functional group which is similar to an aldehyde, in which a sulfur (S) atom replaces the oxygen (O) atom of the aldehyde (R represents an alkyl or aryl group). Thioaldehydes are even more reactive than thioketones. Unhindered thioaldehydes are generally too reactive to be isolated — for example, thioformaldehyde, condenses to the cyclic trimer 1,3,5-trithiane. Thioacrolein, formed by decomposition of allicin from garlic, undergoes a self Diels-Alder reaction giving isomeric vinyldithiins. While thioformaldehyde is highly reactive, it is found in interstellar space along with its mono- and di-deuterated isotopologues. With sufficient steric bulk, however, stable thioaldehydes can be isolated.

In early work, the existence of thioaldehydes was inferred by trapping processes.

See also
Thioketone
Thioenol
Organosulfur compounds

References

Functional groups